The 2012 IAAF World Challenge was the second edition of the annual, global circuit of one-day track and field competitions organized by the International Association of Athletics Federations (IAAF). The series featured a total of fourteen meetings – one more than the previous year as the Jamaica International Invitational was added to the schedule.

Schedule

References

External links
Official website

2011
World Challenge Meetings